Erik Alfred Strandmark (14 September 1919 – 5 January 1963) was a Swedish film actor. He was born in Torsåker, Sweden and died in a plane crash in Trinidad and Tobago in 1963.

Partial filmography

 Live Dangerously (1944) - Corporal on the Train
 We Need Each Other (1944) - Guest at Café
 Den osynliga muren (1944) - Guest at the Restaurant (uncredited)
 Kungliga patrasket (1945) - Hans svärson
 Det glada kalaset (1946) - Hostel Guest (uncredited)
 In the Arms of the Sea (1951) - Holger Rehnberg
 U-Boat 39 (1952) - John Nilsson
 Love (1952) - Anton Tomasson
 Unmarried Mothers (1953) - Ned
 Barabbas (1953) - Petrus
 The Road to Klockrike (1953) - Hällman
 Sawdust and Tinsel (1953) - Jens
 Hidden in the Fog (1953) - Olle Lindaeus
 Speed Fever (1953) - Hebbe
 Storm Over Tjurö (1954) - Narrator (uncredited)
 Seger i mörker (1954) - Mellander
 Karin Månsdotter (1954) - Welam Welamsson
 Salka Valka (1954) - Steinthor Steinsson
 Wild Birds (1955) - Furniture dealer
 Kärlek på turné (1955) - Gråström
 The People of Hemsö (1955) - Carlsson
 Night Child (1956) - Leo Devell
 Kulla-Gulla (1956) - Karlberg
 The Hard Game (1956) - Wille Thoren
 The Girl in Tails (1956) - Blom
 Lille Fridolf och jag (1956) - Göransson
 Tarps Elin (1956) - Tryggve Linde
 Stage Entrance (1956) - Torén
 The Seventh Seal (1957) - Jonas Skat
 Vägen genom Skå (1957) - Walter
 Encounters in the Twilight (1957) - Victor Strömgren
 Night Light (1957) - Nice Ruffian
 Blonde in Bondage (1957) - Olle - Show Manager
 Mästerdetektiven Blomkvist lever farligt (1957) - Mr. Lisander
 The Minister of Uddarbo (1957) - Ris Erik Eriksson
 Woman in a Fur Coat (1958) - Lennart Hägg
 We at Väddö (1958) - Ströms-Janne
 No Time to Kill (1959) - Concierge
 Sköna Susanna och gubbarna (1959) - Joakim

References

External links

1919 births
1963 deaths
Swedish male film actors
Victims of aviation accidents or incidents in 1963
Victims of aviation accidents or incidents in Trinidad and Tobago
1963 in Trinidad and Tobago
20th-century Swedish male actors